Class C is a class of airspace in the United States which follows International Civil Aviation Organization (ICAO) air space designation. Class C airspace areas are designed to improve aviation safety by reducing the risk of mid-air collisions in the terminal area and enhance the management of air traffic operations therein. Aircraft operating in these airspace areas are subject to certain operating rules and equipment requirements.

Class C airspace protects the approach and departure paths from aircraft not under air traffic control. All aircraft inside Class C airspace are subject to air traffic control. Traffic operating under VFR must be in communication with a controller before entering the airspace. The airspace is similar to Class B's "upside-down wedding cake", but much smaller and simpler. The innermost ring with a radius of  typically extends from the surface area around the airport to  AGL (above ground level; charted in MSL), and an outer ring, with a radius of  that typically surrounds the inner ring and extends from a floor at  AGL, (also charted in MSL), to the ceiling at  AGL, (again charted in MSL).  These dimensions are sometimes highly customized when deemed necessary to accommodate IFR traffic patterns and other surrounding airspace design issues such as the overlapping or close proximities to other classes of airspace.

As of January 2023, there are 122 Class C airports in the United States (counting NAS Whiting Field as 2 different airports).

The following list of Class C airports is sorted by state/territory and IATA Airport Code/ICAO Airport Code.

United States

United States territories

Puerto Rico
 SJU / TJSJ Luís Muñoz Marin International Airport (San Juan)

Virgin Islands
 STT / TIST Cyril E. King Airport (Charlotte Amalie, St. Thomas)

See also
 List of Class B airports in the United States
 List of Class D airports in the United States
 Terminal radar service area

References

Class C